Tropical Storm Gilda in 1973 was the first documented tropical cyclone on record to transition into a subtropical cyclone. It formed on October 16 in the western Caribbean Sea from a tropical wave, and strengthened to reach peak winds of 70 mph (110 km/h) before striking Cuba. It later moved slowly through the Bahamas before weakening to tropical depression status. On October 24, with the assistance of a cold front off the coast of the eastern United States, Gilda transformed into a subtropical storm, becoming very large and strong. The storm later accelerated northeastward and became extratropical, ultimately dissipating near Greenland.

The storm first brought heavy rainfall to Jamaica, causing six deaths and some damage from mudslides. While crossing Cuba and later the Bahamas, the storm caused little impact, limited to some crop damage. As a subtropical storm, Gilda brought gusty winds and high waves to much of the east coast of the United States, causing minor beach erosion and coastal property damage.

Storm history

A tropical wave moved off the west coast of Africa on October 3. It tracked westward, reaching the Caribbean Sea on October 10. By October 13, a large area of convection persisted from Hispaniola southwestward through Panama, and over the next few days the convection organized and concentrated in the northwestern Caribbean Sea. An anticyclone became established near Jamaica on October 15, which created a favorable upper-level environment for the system by reducing wind shear. Around the same time, a low-level trough emerged from the Intertropical Convergence Zone, heading north off the coast of Nicaragua. Early on October 16, the system developed into a broad tropical depression about halfway between Central America and Jamaica.

The initial motion of the depression was uncertain, as steering currents could have resulted in a motion either to the west or to the north-northeast. With the possibility of the western track, the storm was remarked as being the first serious hurricane threat for southern Florida since Hurricane Gladys in 1968. However, after formation the depression moved slowly north-northeastward. The thunderstorm activity gradually became better organized while rainbands increased around the circulation. By 0000 UTC on October 18, the depression attained tropical storm status about 100 mi (160 km) northwest of the Cayman Islands, after which it was named Gilda by the National Hurricane Center (NHC). The storm quickly strengthened as it moved toward southern Cuba, reaching peak winds of 70 mph (110 km/h) about 18 hours after reaching tropical storm status. Shortly thereafter, Gilda made landfall near the border of the present day Cuban provinces of Sancti Spíritus and Ciego de Ávila.

Tropical Storm Gilda weakened slightly over Cuba, crossing the island in less than twelve hours before emerging into the Atlantic Ocean early on October 19. At the time, the anticyclone over Jamaica which previously assisted the cyclone instead remained over the Caribbean, which increased shear over the storm. This caused the convection to gradually separate from the low-level circulation. Early on October 20, Gilda passed just southeast of Andros Island in the Bahamas, around the same time that the Hurricane Hunters recorded an atmospheric pressure of 994 mbar; this was the lowest recorded pressure in association with Gilda while it was a tropical cyclone. It gradually weakened due to the wind shear, resulting in the low-level steering currents becoming dominant. After moving through the Exuma island chain, the storm passed near or over Eleuthera, and late on October 21 Gilda became nearly stationary about 60 mi (95 km/h) east of Harbour Island. Late on October 22, after moving only about 6 mi (10 km) in a 24‑hour period, Gilda weakened to a tropical depression.

Now a tropical depression, Gilda remained nearly stationary for another 24 hours before accelerating northeastward, under the influence of an upper-level trough exiting the east coast of the United States. Cold air from the trough interacted with Gilda, providing a baroclinic environment for intensifying, and on October 24 the storm transitioned into a subtropical storm about halfway between Hispaniola and North Carolina. This made Gilda the first tropical storm on record to transition into a subtropical cyclone. Operationally, tropical storm advisories were still issued on Gilda while it was subtropical, due to the need to maintain consistency and the possibility it could again become tropical. The circulation of the storm became very large, at one point stretching from New England to the Bahamas, and eastward beyond Bermuda, or a diameter of more than 1300 mi (2100 km). On October 25, Gilda passed about halfway between Bermuda and Cape Hatteras, when it reached peak winds of 70 mph (110 km/h). Subsequently, it turned northeastward, and on October 27 attained a minimum pressure of 984 mbar, the lowest of its duration while tropical or subtropical. Later that day, Gilda became an extratropical cyclone southeast of the Canadian Maritimes as it moved over colder waters. After passing just southeast of Newfoundland, the storm continued northeastward, becoming nearly stationary off the coast of Greenland before dissipating on October 30.

Preparations, impact, and records

Tropical Storm Gilda first affected Jamaica, bringing heavy rainfall in a three-day period. The rains produced landslides, particularly in Saint Andrew Parish where six houses were destroyed. Elsewhere on the island, the mudslides caused further property damage and left some roads unpassable. Six people were killed throughout the country. The storm did not have significant impact in Cuba. A station in the mountains of what was then known as Oriente Province recorded winds of 60 mph (95 km/h). The city of Morón, located along the northern coast of Cuba, recorded 6.13 inches (155 mm) of rainfall in the 6 hour period prior to the storm passing the area. Damage was minor, limited to some crop damage in the eastern portion of the island, as well as power outages. The threat of the storm forced several thousand people to leave their homes.

In the Bahamas, officials closed schools, and many businesses closed early on the day the storm moved through the country. The storm's stationary motion caused several days of high tides and heavy rains. Tropical storm force wind gusts were reported on Andros Island, and gusts peaked at 75 mph (120 km/h) on Golden Cay. Gilda's passage left crop damage on several islands, although monetary losses in the country were minor.

When Gilda was forecast to move near southeastern Florida, gale warnings were issued from North Key Largo to Fort Lauderdale. Rough seas affected the Florida coastline for about 72 hours, causing moderate coastal property damage and beach erosion. After becoming a large subtropical cyclone, gale warnings were issued at various times from Cape Hatteras, North Carolina to the mouth of the Merrimack River in Massachusetts. High surf and minor beach erosion were reported along the coastline, and gale-force winds were observed from North Carolina to New Jersey. Over the western Atlantic Ocean, the storm produced strong winds and rough seas. One ship reported a wave height of 28 ft (8.5 m), though no significant marine losses were reported. Around the time of it becoming extratropical, Sable Island off the coast of Nova Scotia recorded a wind gust of 74 mph (119 km/h).

Tropical Storm Gilda was notable as being the first observed tropical cyclone to transition into a subtropical cyclone; several subtropical cyclones have undergone tropical cyclogenesis, but never the opposite. Since Gilda, a few other storms accomplished the feat. In 1980, a tropical depression dissipated, reformed as a subtropical depression, and later became Hurricane Georges over the open Atlantic Ocean. The next year, Tropical Storm Jose became subtropical near the end of its duration, and in 1984, Hurricane Klaus became a subtropical storm over the western Atlantic Ocean. In 2001, Tropical Storm Allison, after causing devastating flooding in Texas, became a subtropical storm over the Gulf of Mexico and moved across much of the southeastern United States. In 2011, Tropical Storm Lee transitioned into a subtropical storm while approaching Louisiana.

See also

Other tropical cyclones named Gilda

External links

Gilda
Gilda (1973)
Gilda (1973)
Gilda (1973)
Gilda (1973)
Gilda (1973)